Taryn Stephanie Power (September 13, 1953 – June 26, 2020) was an American actress.

Biography

Early life
Taryn was born in Los Angeles, California, in 1953, to actors Tyrone Power and Linda Christian. When her parents divorced in 1956, her mother took Power and her elder sister Romina to live all around the world, mainly spending their childhoods in Italy and Spain.

Career
Power acted in eight films, the first two in Spanish, the rest mostly English language films. Her most notable roles were as "Valentine De Villefort" in The Count of Monte Cristo (1975), with Richard Chamberlain, Donald Pleasence, and Tony Curtis, and as "Dione" in Sinbad and the Eye of the Tiger (1977), starring Patrick Wayne and Jane Seymour.

Personal life
Taryn's father died in 1958 of a massive heart attack when she was five. In 1975, she met photographer Norman Seeff in Los Angeles, and eventually married him shortly before the birth of her first child, Tai. They split and eventually divorced in 1982. Power also had two children, Anthony Tyrone and Valentina Fox, with musician Tony Sales (son of comedian Soupy Sales) in the 1980s.  She later married William Greendeer and had a fourth child, Stella Greendeer, on April 21, 1996.

She died from leukemia on June 26, 2020, after a four and a half year battle against the disease.

Filmography

Award nominations

References

External links

1953 births
2020 deaths
Actresses from Los Angeles
American film actresses
American people of Dutch descent
American people of English descent
American people of French descent
American people of French-Canadian descent
American people of German descent
American people of Irish descent
American actresses of Mexican descent
American people of Spanish descent
American socialites
American television actresses
Deaths from cancer in Wisconsin
Deaths from leukemia
Hispanic and Latino American actresses
Power family
21st-century American women